Sancho Ordóñez (before 1042 – c. 1080), was a count who lived in the 11th century.  His father was Ordoño Bermúdez, an illegitimate son of King Bermudo II of León, and his mother was Fronilde Peláez, also a member of the high nobility as the daughter of Count Pelayo Rodríguez and his wife Gotina Fernández de Cea, daughter of Count Fernando Bermúdez de Cea and sister of Jimena, the mother of King Sancho Garcés III the Great, and of Justa Fernández, married to Count Flaín Muñoz.

Biographical sketch 
He was named count between 1059 and 1061 when he appears with the title in several family transactions and royal charters, such as one dated 1061 at the Monastery of Samos when he confirms as Sanctius proles Ordonii comes (Sancho, son of Ordoño, count).  Count Sancho was a member of the Curia regis of his cousins King Fernando I and Sancha of León and in 1059 confirmed a private transaction between these monarchs and Fronilde Ovéquiz.  He also appears in charters issued by King Alfonso VI, including one dated 1071 when he confirms as Sancio Ordoniz comes a donation made by the king to Velasco Vela, and in 1073 at the Monastery of Samos when the king named him one of the judges entrusted with settling a dispute between the abbot of the monastery and Ero Peláez. In 1077, Count Sancho  donated the properties in Villarín de Campos that he had inherited from his grandfather, count Pelayo Rodríguez, to the Cathedral of León.

Marriage and issue
Before 1082, Count Sancho married Onneca (also appears as Onega) Ovéquiz, daughter of Count Oveco Bermúdez and his wife Elvira Suárez, and sister of counts Bermudo, Vela, and Rodrigo Ovéquiz.  The offspring of this marriage were:

 Oveco Sánchez (died c. 1116), count, married Elvo Álvarez before 1085, with issue;
 Bermudo Sánchez, mentioned by his mother and brother Vela in a charter from the Cathedral of Lugo;
 Vela Sánchez (died before 1109);
 Fronilde Sánchez (died before 1108), the wife of Count Nuño Velázquez. One of their sons, Melendo Núñez, was the father of Nuño Meléndez, the first husband of Queen Urraca López de Haro, and their firstborn, Count Alfonso Núñez, was the father of Teresa Alfonso, wife of Egas Moniz, the tutor of King Afonso I of Portugal. They were also the parents of Sancho Núñez who married Infanta Sancha Henriques, daughter of Henry, Count of Portugal; 
 Jimena Sánchez, who appears as of August 10, 1093, as a nun at the Cistercian monastery of San Salvador in Ferreira de Pantón. Her filiation is attested in a charter dated January 26, 1108 when she declares herself the daughter of Count Sancho and granddaughter of Ordoño Bermudez, and makes a donation of some of her estates in Sarria, Lemos and Asma, which was confirmed by King Alfonso VI and by several bishops.

Notes

References

Bibliography 

 
 
 
 
 

Counts of Spain
11th-century people from the Kingdom of León
1080 deaths
Year of birth unknown
Year of birth uncertain